Pachylebia pallipes is a species of beetle in the family Carabidae, the only species in the genus Pachylebia.

References

Lebiinae